Çiğdem Selışık Onat (born 14 May 1939) is a Turkish actress.

Life and career
Selışık Onat was born in Ankara in 1939. After finishing her studies at Robert College, she enrolled in Istanbul University's School of Literature. She subsequently started working at Kenter Theatre and Ankara State Theatre. She got her master's degree from the University of North Carolina at Chapel Hill. She continued her doctorate program on comparative drama studies at the same university. She continued her career in the United States by both appearing and staging a number of plays at Lincoln Center and the New York University Tisch School of the Arts. In Turkey, she worked as a director at the Istanbul City Theatres. Her portrayal of Signora Fioria in the play The Time of the Cuckoo, which was staged at Lincoln Center, earned her a nomination for the Drama Desk Award for Outstanding Featured Actress in a Play in 2000.

During her nearly forty-year career as an educator she taught various theatre and acting courses at the University of North Carolina School of the Arts and graduate acting classes at the New York University Tisch School of the Arts. She also taught acting and drama courses at Koç University for about 4 years.

Selected filmography

Awards and nominations

References

External links
 

1939 births
Living people
Actresses from Ankara
Turkish film actresses
Turkish stage actresses
Turkish television actresses
Robert College alumni